Jaipur Shopping Festival is an annual shopping festival conducted each year in the month of September and October in Jaipur, India.

External links
 

Shopping festivals
Retail markets in India
Culture of Jaipur